The Institut pro křesťansko-demokratickou politiku, z. ú. (IKDP; Institute for Christian Democratic Politics) is a Czech political party think-tank associated with Christian-democratic KDU-ČSL. The foundation's headquarters are located in Palác Charitas in Prague, headquarters of the party.

Establishment and mission

It was established in 2015 by leadership of KDU-ČSL. Its goal is to promote Christian democratic values.

International Council members
Jan Sokol
Petr Pithart
Georg Milbradt
Jerzy Buzek
Iveta Radičová

References

External links
 

KDU-ČSL
Political and economic think tanks based in the European Union
Think tanks based in the Czech Republic